Gräfenberg may refer to: 

 Gräfenberg, Bavaria, a town in Franconia, Germany
 Lázně Jeseník (German name Gräfenberg), administrative part of city Jeseník, Czech Republic
 Gräfenberg Spa, a spa founded by Vincent Priessnitz in Lázně Jeseník
 Gräfenberg (Spessart) (363.6 m), a hill in the Spessart near Rottenberg, Markt Hösbach, in the district of Aschaffenburg, Bavaria, Germany
 Gräfenberg Castle (Aschaffenburg), district of Aschaffenburg
 Gräfenberg Castle (Forchheim), district of Forchheim
 Ernst Gräfenberg, German gynaecologist
 Gräfenberg spot or G-spot, area of female anatomy discovered by Ernst Gräfenberg

See also 
 Grafenberg (disambiguation) (non-umlaut form)
 Grevenberg